Daniel Lugo may refer to:

 Daniel Lugo (actor) (born 1945), Puerto Rican actor
 Daniel Lugo (convict), central character in the movie Pain & Gain, played by Mark Wahlberg